Patricia Anderson Welsh (née Carroll; February 11, 1915 – January 26, 1995) was an American actress. She was known as the raspy voice of E.T. in the 1982 film E.T. the Extra-Terrestrial.

Career
Welsh was a radio soap opera actress and only appeared in three films, all uncredited. The only movie in which she was seen was the 1940 World War I film Waterloo Bridge.

She was the voice of E.T. in the 1982 film E.T. the Extra-Terrestrial. As a chain smoker, she had a raspy voice that gave E.T. his trademark speech sound. She also had been hired by George Lucas to be the voice of Boushh in the film Return of the Jedi.

Personal life and death
Welsh died of pneumonia on January 26, 1995, in Green Valley, Arizona.

Notes

External links

 
 

1915 births
1995 deaths
20th-century American actresses
Actresses from San Francisco
American film actresses
American voice actresses
Deaths from pneumonia in Arizona
People from Green Valley, Arizona